Conus mascarenensis is a species of sea snail, a marine gastropod mollusk in the family Conidae, the cone snails and their allies.

Like all species within the genus Conus, these marine snails are predatory and venomous. They are capable of "stinging" humans, therefore live ones should be handled carefully or not at all.

Description
The size of the shell attains 110.6 mm.

Distribution
This species occurs in the Indian Ocean off Réunion.

References

 Monnier E. & Limpalaër L. (2019). Pionoconus mascarenensis (Gastropoda: Conidae) a new species of the P. gubernator / leehmani complex from South-Western Indian Ocean. Xenophora Taxonomy. 24: 32-52 page(s): 33, pl. 1 figs 1–6, pl. 2 figs 1-13, pl. 3 figs 1-14

mascarenensis
Gastropods described in 2019